Ossi Reijo Juhani Väänänen (born August 18, 1980) is a Finnish former professional ice hockey defenceman. He was the captain of Jokerit of the Kontinental Hockey League (KHL), with whom he has previously won two silver medals as runner-up for the Kanada-malja in 2000 and 2005 in the Finnish Liiga. He was originally drafted by the Phoenix Coyotes and has additionally played for the Colorado Avalanche, Philadelphia Flyers and Vancouver Canucks in the National Hockey League (NHL).

Playing career
After a junior career with Jokerit's under-18 and junior teams, Väänänen was drafted by the Phoenix Coyotes in the 1998 NHL Entry Draft as their second-round pick, 43rd overall. He remained in Finland to play with Jokerit in the professional SM-liiga for two seasons, winning a silver medal with the team in 2000 as runner-up for the Kanada-malja, the SM-liiga's championship trophy. Väänänen then joined the Coyotes in 2000–01 and recorded 16 points in his rookie season. In his fourth season with the Coyotes in 2003–04, he was traded at the trade deadline to the Colorado Avalanche (along with Chris Gratton and a second-round draft choice, used to select Paul Stastny) in 2005 in exchange for Derek Morris and Keith Ballard.

Due to the subsequent NHL lockout, Väänänen returned to Jokerit in 2004–05 and helped his former team to another silver medal, losing the Finnish championship to Kärpät. Returning to the NHL in 2005–06, he played two more seasons with the Avalanche before returning to Europe to play in the Swedish Elitserien for Djurgårdens IF during the 2007–08 season.

On July 1, 2008, Väänänen signed a one-year contract with the Philadelphia Flyers. However, late in the 2008–09 season, on February 27, 2009, he was placed on waivers and claimed by the Vancouver Canucks. The move by the Flyers, which also included waiving Glen Metropolit, was precipitated by the imminent return of forward Daniel Brière from injury, requiring the club to dump salary to remain under the cap. On August 2, 2009, Väänänen joined national teammate Ville Peltonen, signing a one-year contract with Dynamo Minsk of the Kontinental Hockey League (KHL). He appeared in 52 games and recorded 6 assists as Minsk failed to make the playoffs in 2009–10.

On May 3, 2010, Väänänen returned to Finland signing a contract with his original club, Jokerit, of the SM-liiga.

On July 13, 2016, after six additional seasons with Jokerit, Väänänen retired from professional hockey, having been restricted to just six games due to injury in the 2015–16 season.

International play

As a junior, Väänänen competed for Finland at the European Junior Championships in 1998 and World Junior Championships in 1999 and 2000.  At the senior level, he has represented team Finland in five World Championships, earning a silver medal in 2001 and a bronze medal in 2008. In 2011 he won a gold medal.

At the 2004 World Cup of Hockey, Väänänen contributed an international career-high three points in four games, helping Finland to the World Cup final, where they were defeated by Canada. He made his Winter Olympics debut at the 2002 Games in Salt Lake City. Four years later, he was named to the Finnish team for the 2006 Winter Olympics in Turin, where he earned a silver medal despite not appearing in any games.

Awards
Won the Finnish Junior Player of the Year Award in 2000.

Career statistics

Regular season and playoffs

International

Transactions
June 27, 1998 – Drafted in the second round, 43rd overall, by the Phoenix Coyotes at the 1998 NHL Entry Draft.
March 9, 2004 – Traded to the Colorado Avalanche from the Phoenix Coyotes along with Chris Gratton and a second-round choice (Paul Stastny) in 2005 in exchange for Derek Morris and Keith Ballard
December 1, 2004 – Signed as a free agent by Jokerit.
July 1, 2008 – Signed to a one-year contract by the Philadelphia Flyers.
February 27, 2009 – Put on waivers by the Philadelphia Flyers, claimed by the Vancouver Canucks.

Source:

References

External links
 

1980 births
Living people
Arizona Coyotes draft picks
Colorado Avalanche players
Djurgårdens IF Hockey players
Finnish ice hockey defencemen
HC Dinamo Minsk players
Ice hockey players at the 2002 Winter Olympics
Ice hockey players at the 2006 Winter Olympics
Ice hockey players at the 2014 Winter Olympics
Jokerit players
Medalists at the 2006 Winter Olympics
Medalists at the 2014 Winter Olympics
Olympic bronze medalists for Finland
Olympic ice hockey players of Finland
Olympic medalists in ice hockey
Sportspeople from Vantaa
Philadelphia Flyers players
Phoenix Coyotes players
Vancouver Canucks players